Udanin  is a village in Środa Śląska County, Lower Silesian Voivodeship, in the south-western region of Poland. It is the seat of the administrative district (gmina) called Gmina Udanin.

According data of June 30, 2004 The commune was inhabited by 5665 people. According to data from June 30, 2020, Udanin had 5067 residents.

Land use 
According to data from 2002 The Udanin commune has an area of 110.71 km², including:
 Agricultural land: 87%
 Forest use: 4%

The municipality accounts for 15.73% of the Powiat (county) area.

District Villiages 
Damianowo, Drogomiłowice, Dziwigórz, Gościsław, Jarosław, Jarostów, Karnice, Konary, Lasek, Lusina, Łagiewniki Średzkie , Pichorowice,  Piekary, Pilaszkowice, Różana, Sokolniki, Udanin, Ujazd Dolny, Ujazd Górny.

Other places 
Dębki,  Dębnica, Jańczów,  moons.

neighboring municipalities 
Kostomłoty,  Mściwojów,  Strzegom,  Środa Śląska,  Wądroże Wielkie,  Żarów

footnotes

References

Udanin